The Korea National Opera (founded 2000) is an independent foundation of its main performing venue, the new Seoul Arts Center. The central external bow of the new arts centre has the sign Seoul Opera House above the windows. The company was formed from what had previously from 1962 been a department under the National Theater of Korea in Seoul.

References

Opera companies
Music organizations based in South Korea
Musical groups established in 2000
Opera in South Korea